Mostafa Shojaei is an Iranian footballer who plays as a forward for Mes Kerman in the Azadegan League.

Career
Shojaei started his career with Sepahan at youth level. After spending four years in Division 1, in 2011 he joined Mes Kerman.

Club career statistics

References

External links
Mostafa Shojaei at PersianLeague.com

1983 births
Living people
People from Kerman
Iranian footballers
Association football forwards
Sepahan Novin players
Foolad Natanz players
Sanat Mes Kerman F.C. players
Zob Ahan Esfahan F.C. players
Paykan F.C. players
Persian Gulf Pro League players
Azadegan League players